Derrick Luckassen (born 3 July 1995) is a Dutch professional footballer who plays as a centre back for Israeli Premier League  club Maccabi Tel Aviv.

Club career

AZ
Luckassen is a graduate of the AZ youth academy. He captained the youth team during the 2013–14 campaign. On 29 August 2014, he signed a professional contract with the club, keeping him there until 2018.

Luckassen made his professional debut for the club against Dordrecht. He first played a whole match against Twente.

PSV Eindhoven 
On 10 July 2017, Luckassen moved to league rivals PSV on a five-year deal until 2022.

He came off the bench on the 15 April 2018 as PSV beat rivals Ajax 3–0 to clinch the 2017–18 Eredivisie title.

Loan to Hertha Berlin
On 28 August 2018, Luckassen moved to Bundesliga side Hertha BSC on a season-long loan for the season.

Loan to Anderlecht 
On 31 August, 19, Luckassen was loaned to Belgium side Anderlecht on a season-long loan. On 6 June, 2020, PSV Eindhoven agreed to loan Luckassen to Anderlecht for another season.

Loan to Kasımpaşa
On 11 January 2021, due to a lack of playing time Luckassen ended his loan at Anderlecht, and moved to Turkish club, Kasımpaşa, on loan until the end of June.

Loan to Fatih Karagümrük
On 9 June 2021, he returned to Turkey on a new loan, joining Fatih Karagümrük.

International career
Luckassen was born in the Netherlands to parents of Ghanaian descent, and has represented the Netherlands at youth level.

Honours
PSV
Johan Cruyff Shield: 2022

References

External links
 
 
 AZ Alkmaar profile
 Voetbal International profile 
 

1995 births
Living people
Footballers from Amsterdam
Association football defenders
Dutch footballers
AZ Alkmaar players
PSV Eindhoven players
Hertha BSC players
R.S.C. Anderlecht players
Kasımpaşa S.K. footballers
Fatih Karagümrük S.K. footballers
Maccabi Tel Aviv F.C. players
Eredivisie players
Bundesliga players
Belgian Pro League players
Süper Lig players
Israeli Premier League players
Netherlands under-21 international footballers
Netherlands youth international footballers
Dutch sportspeople of Ghanaian descent
Dutch expatriate footballers
Expatriate footballers in Germany
Expatriate footballers in Belgium
Expatriate footballers in Turkey
Expatriate footballers in Israel
Dutch expatriate sportspeople in Germany
Dutch expatriate sportspeople in Belgium
Dutch expatriate sportspeople in Turkey
Dutch expatriate sportspeople in Israel